Odorrana khalam is a species of frog in the family Ranidae. It is found in the mountains of southern Laos and central Vietnam. It is also likely to be found in northeastern Cambodia.

It is probably threatened to some extent by habitat loss occurring within its range. It is known to occur in a number of protected areas.

References

khalam
Frogs of Asia
Amphibians of Laos
Amphibians of Vietnam
Amphibians described in 2005
Taxonomy articles created by Polbot